Joseph (Yosef) Weinreb (1869–1943), also known as the "Galitzianer Rav," was the first chief rabbi of Toronto, Canada.

Biography
Joseph Weinreb was born in Busk, Galicia, son of Rabbi Baruch Shlomo Weinreb and his wife Soore Ratze.

Rabbinic career
He worked as a rabbi in Iași, Romania after receiving his smicha (rabbinical ordination) from the Brejaner Rebbe. Around the year 1900, he received an invitation at the suggestion of his brother-in-law, Binyamin Kurtz, who was living in Toronto at that time, to serve as the rabbi of Toronto's Shomrai Shabbos congregation. The congregation had just purchased a building on Chestnut Street. Weinreb moved to Toronto with his two daughters, Malka and Lil,  after his wife, Ethel, died in childbirth. In Toronto, he married his niece, Freyda, with whom he had three more children, Soore Ratze, Sol and Ruth. The rabbi purchased a home on Henry Street across from the Poilishe Shul, and continued to head the congregation for more than 40 years. After an ideological split in the congregation, a new synagogue was built on Terauley Street, on land donated by Zelig Shapira.

Weinreb died on October 15, 1943 in Toronto. His successor was Rabbi Gedalia Felder.

See also
 History of the Jews in Toronto

References

External links
Documents in Ontario Jewish Archives

Canadian Orthodox rabbis
Canadian people of Ukrainian-Jewish descent
Canadian people of Romanian-Jewish descent
Emigrants from the Russian Empire to Canada
20th-century Canadian rabbis
19th-century Romanian rabbis
1869 births
1943 deaths
Rabbis from Toronto
People from Busk, Ukraine
Romanian people of Ukrainian-Jewish descent